Chanakya Chandragupta is a 1977 Indian Telugu-language historical drama film, produced and directed by N. T. Rama Rao under his Ramakrishna Cine Studios banner. It stars Rama Rao, Akkineni Nageswara Rao, Sivaji Ganesan, Jayapradha and Manjula, with music composed by Pendyala Nageswara Rao. The film is based on the 3rd century BC Maurya Emperor Chandragupta Maurya and his mentor Chanakya.

Plot 

The film is a historical story, based on the 3rd century BC Maurya Emperor Chandragupta Maurya and his mentor Chanakya. It follows how they destroyed the Nanda Dynasty, defeated Alexander the Great and established the Maurya Empire.

Cast 
 N. T. Rama Rao as Chandragupta Maurya
  Akkineni Nageswara Rao as Chanakya
 Sivaji Ganesan as Alexander the Great
 Manjula as Chhaya
 Jaya Prada as Aasa
 Kaikala Satyanarayana as Rakshasa Mantri
 S. Varalakshmi as Muradevi
 Prabhakar Reddy as Parvathakudu
 Rajanala as Mahapadma Nandulu
 Mukkamala as Ambhi
 Raja Babu as Nandulu
 Padmanabham as Nandulu
 Rao Gopal Rao as Nandulu
 K.K. Sarma as Nandulu
 Chalapathi Rao as Kaapalika
 Jaya Malini as item number
 Halam as item number
 Sarathi as Nandulu
 Potti Prasad as Nandulu
Chitti Babu as Nandulu

Soundtrack 
Music composed by Pendyala Nageswara Rao. Lyrics were written by C. Narayana Reddy.

References

External links 
 

1970s biographical films
1970s historical films
1970s Telugu-language films
1977 films
Films directed by N. T. Rama Rao
Films scored by Pendyala Nageswara Rao
Films set in the Maurya Empire
History of India on film
Indian biographical films
Indian historical films
Works about the Maurya Empire